Blackhall railway station served the town of Shotts, North Lanarkshire, Scotland, from 1864 to 1893 on the Wilsontown, Morningside and Coltness Railway.

History 
The first site of the station was opened on 2 June 1845 by the Wilsontown, Morningside and Coltness Railway. It was named after Blackhall Farm, which was to the west. It closed in December 1852 but reopened on 19 September 1864. A branch opened in 1859 which served Shotts Iron Works. The station closed to passengers on 1 November 1893 due to the remodelling of the junction where it was situated and a signal box opened nearby. The timetable shows the station being used by surfacemen in 1923.

References 

Disused railway stations in North Lanarkshire
Railway stations in Great Britain opened in 1845
Railway stations in Great Britain closed in 1852
Railway stations in Great Britain opened in 1864
Railway stations in Great Britain closed in 1893
1845 establishments in Scotland
1893 disestablishments in Scotland